Chinabrahmadevam is a village in Peddapuram Mandal, located in East Godavari District of the Indian state of Andhra Pradesh.

References 

Villages in East Godavari district